Wallaceville railway station is a suburban railway station serving Wallaceville in Upper Hutt, New Zealand. Trains between Upper Hutt and Wellington stop at Wallaceville.

Metlink tickets can be purchased from the dairy on the corner of Maclean and Ward Streets. It is popular with commuters as there is a large park and ride facility as well as bicycle lockers.

History
The station was opened in 1878. when it was a "flag stop". The station closed from 1 July 1881; see NZR notice of 3 June 1881.

The station was opened and closed in the 19th century; Scoble refers to a Whiteman's Valley platform c1879. The flag station was closed on 1 July 1891.

The station reopened in the 20th century; it was reopened by 1903 when a new Ministry of Agriculture research station was to be established nearby.

In 1963 convenient rail access was mentioned in a job advertisement.

The section between Upper Hutt to Trentham was single track, but as part of the 2020-2021 Wellington Metro Rail Upgrade (and as proposed in the 20112012 Regional Rail Plan (RRP)) the section was double-tracked by 2021. The original platform is used by up or northbound trains and the new platform built  to the east for down or southbound trains, with a building similar to the Ava station building.

References

External links
 Passenger service timetables from Metlink
 1967 photo of 1955-1978 building

Rail transport in Wellington
Public transport in the Wellington Region
Buildings and structures in Upper Hutt
Railway stations in New Zealand
Railway stations opened in 1879